A staphylotoxin can be any of these toxins produced by Staphylococcus bacteria:  

Staphylococcus aureus alpha toxin
Staphylococcus aureus beta toxin
Staphylococcus aureus delta toxin
Staphylococcal Enterotoxin B
Exfoliatin
Panton-Valentine leukocidin
Toxic shock syndrome toxin